Iberian gauge is a track gauge of , most extensively used by the railways of Spain and Portugal. This is the second-widest gauge in regular use anywhere in the world. Indian gauge railways, are  wider.   

As finally established in 1955, the Iberian gauge is a compromise between the similar, but slightly different, gauges adopted as respective national standards in Spain and Portugal in the mid-19th century. The main railway networks of Spain were initially constructed to a  gauge of six Castilian feet.

Standard gauge
Although the 22 km from Tardienta to Huesca (part of a branch from the Madrid to Barcelona high-speed line) has been reconstructed as mixed Iberic and standard gauge, in general the interface between the two gauges in Spain is dealt with by means of gauge-changing installations, which can adjust the gauge of appropriately designed wheelsets on the move.

Plans exist to convert more of the Iberian-gauge network in Spain and Portugal to standard gauge, an indication of which is the use, on several stretches of recently relaid broad-gauge track, of concrete sleepers pre-drilled with additional bolt holes allowing for repositioning of one rail to adjust the track to standard gauge (or to dual gauge) or the narrowing of the gauge by moving both rails closer together maintaining the perfect alignment of the loading gauge.

Similar gauges and compatibility
The Indian gauge is closely similar, with only  difference, and allows compatibility with the rolling stock. For example, in recent years Chile and Argentina have bought second hand Spanish/Portuguese Iberian-gauge rolling stock. 1,668 mm trains can run on 1,676 mm gauge without adaptation, but for better stability in high-speed running a replacement wheelset may be required (for example, the Russian-Finnish train Allegro is built for a 1,522 mm track gauge, intermediate between the Russian 1,520 mm and the Finnish 1,524 mm). Backward compatibility—1,676 mm trains on 1,668 mm gauge—is possible, but no examples and data exist. Due to the somewhat narrower gauge, a strong wear of the wheels may occur if the wheelset is not replaced.

Iberian-gauge railway networks

See also

 History of rail transport in Portugal
 History of rail transport in Spain
 Rail transport in Portugal
 Rail transport in Spain

References

 
Iberian